Carlos Cordero Gómez (born January 7, 1977 in Irapuato, Guanajuato) is a Mexican athlete. He participated at the 2008 Summer Olympics finishing 32nd in the men's Marathon. and he also represented Mexico at the 2012 Summer Olympics.

He won a silver medal in the 1500 metres at the 2010 Central American and Caribbean Games

Achievements

References

External links
 

1977 births
People from Irapuato
Sportspeople from Guanajuato
Living people
Mexican male long-distance runners
Mexican male middle-distance runners
Mexican male marathon runners
Athletes (track and field) at the 2008 Summer Olympics
Athletes (track and field) at the 2011 Pan American Games
Athletes (track and field) at the 2012 Summer Olympics
Olympic athletes of Mexico
Pan American Games competitors for Mexico
Central American and Caribbean Games silver medalists for Mexico
Competitors at the 2010 Central American and Caribbean Games
Central American and Caribbean Games medalists in athletics